Jeffrey Barber is a game designer who has worked primarily on role-playing games.

Career
Jeff Barber was a gamer from Columbia, Missouri, who joined the volunteer staff of Pagan Publishing and collaborated with John Scott Tynes on early adventures and other games. He co-wrote "Grace under pressure"  with Pagan publishing's staff, the book is currently out of print. When Pagan moved to Seattle, Barber and others left Pagan as a result, and went on to found Biohazard Games, publishers of Blue Planet (1997). Fantasy Flight Games spent 2000 pushing out a new line of RPG products: a new edition of Barber's and Greg Benage's Blue Planet. He is one of the author of the Midnight campaign setting.

Bibliography
Killer Crosshairs, Biohazard Games 1995.

References

External links
 

Living people
People from Columbia, Missouri
Role-playing game designers
Year of birth missing (living people)